"Women (Make You Feel Alright)" is a song written by Stevie Wright and George Young. It was originally recorded by the Australian rock group the Easybeats in 1966, whose version reached #4 on the Australian charts.  It was the group's debut single in the United States, released on the United Artists Records subsidiary label, Ascot Records under the title "Make You Feel Alright (Women)".

Single track listing
Women (Make You Feel Alright)
In My Book

Charts

References

1966 singles
1966 songs
The Easybeats songs
Songs written by Stevie Wright (Australian singer)
Songs written by George Young (rock musician)
Parlophone singles
Albert Productions singles